Zanna Bianca alla riscossa (internationally released as White Fang to the Rescue) is a 1974 Italian adventure film directed by Tonino Ricci. It is an unofficial sequel of Lucio Fulci's 1973 film White Fang, in which Ricci was second unit director. The film received mixed reviews.

Plot
In late 19th century Canada, Benjamin Dover, a prospector, is robbed and killed by two outlaws. His friend Burt Halloway, takes over the responsibility for bringing up Benjamin's son, Kim. With the aid of his wolf dog, a "man's best friend", they track down the outlaws and recover the precious metal.

Cast 
 Maurizio Merli: Burt Halloway
 Henry Silva: Mr. Nelson 
 Renzo Palmer: RCMP Sergeant 
 Gisela Hahn: Katie 
 Benito Stefanelli: Jackson  
 Donald O'Brien: Caroll 
 Luciano Rossi: Bailey  
 Attilio Dottesio
 Riccardo Pizzuti: Dog Trainer

References

External links

1974 films
Italian adventure films
1970s adventure films
Films about dogs
Films based on White Fang
Films about wolves
Films directed by Tonino Ricci
Films scored by Carlo Rustichelli
Unofficial sequel films
1970s Italian films